Milwaukee-Downer College was a women's college in Milwaukee, Wisconsin, in operation from 1895 to 1964.

History
Milwaukee-Downer College was established in 1895 with the merger of two institutions: Milwaukee College and Downer College of Fox Lake, Wisconsin. Milwaukee College began as the Milwaukee Female Seminary founded by Mrs. W. L. Parsons, wife of the pastor of the Free Congregational church. It opened on Sept. 14, 1848, in a house in downtown Milwaukee. Two years later Catharine Beecher and her associate Mary Mortimer became connected with the Seminary. Beecher, a reformer and eldest sister of Harriet Beecher Stowe, had designed "The Beecher Plan" for educating women through the college level for professions. She was invited to launch her plan in Milwaukee and came there first in April, 1850.  "The Beecher Plan" focused on four professions most open to women: teaching, child care, nursing, and "conservation of the domestic state".

The school was incorporated in March, 1851, as the Milwaukee Normal Institute and High School, and moved to new quarters. In 1852, through the influence of Beecher, $17,894 was received from her friends in the East and the American Woman's Educational Association; Milwaukeeans raised another $13,540; and a permanent home for the school was commissioned on the corner of Juneau Avenue and Milwaukee Street (near the site later to be occupied by the Milwaukee School of Engineering). The school opened there in the fall of 1852, though the building was not yet finished. By act of the legislature the name was changed in April, 1853, to Milwaukee Female College. In March 1876 the name was changed to Milwaukee College.

Wisconsin Female College was founded in Fox Lake, Wisconsin in 1855. In 1889, its name was changed to Downer College in honor of trustee and benefactor Jason Downer.

In July 1895, Milwaukee College and Downer College merged to become Milwaukee-Downer College with Downer College's Ellen Clara Sabin as president. A new site was chosen on a tract of about ten acres on the northern end of the city of Milwaukee, halfway between Lake Michigan and the Milwaukee River. Two buildings (Merrill and Holton Halls) were constructed, and were first occupied in September, 1899, when Milwaukee-Downer opened in its new quarters. In 1901 a residence hall for students in the college department was completed. According to the report of the state superintendent of public instruction for 1906 the college had 356 students, 32 instructors, and owned property valued at $354,787.

In 1910, the Milwaukee-Downer Seminary high school was separated from the College (prior to that date it was the pre-collegiate section of the College), although a separate corporation was not obtained until 1933.

Leadership
Three presidents led Milwaukee-Downer College from 1895 to 1964: Ellen Clara Sabin from 1895 to 1921, Lucia Russell Briggs from 1921 to 1951, and John B. Johnson from 1951 to 1964. Under Sabin's leadership, the college established a curriculum emphasizing the liberal arts and the cultivation of moral and religious values. Two of the college's long-lasting curricular specializations were home economics and occupational therapy. The program in home economics was established in 1901, and the occupational therapy program was one of the first in the country, established in 1918-1919. Enrollment peaked during Lucia Briggs' tenure at 444 students in the 1946-47 scholastic year. Briggs was succeeded by John B. Johnson, a political science professor with teaching and administrative experience at only one place, Park College in Parkville, Missouri, before coming to Milwaukee-Downer. Under Johnson, the number of men on the faculty increased in almost every year, and the residence halls were closed to women faculty. Johnson also initiated a policy of hiring part-time, ad hoc faculty to teach one or two courses. Through the 1950s and early 1960s, enrollment declined in almost every year, from  278 in 1951-52 to a low of 176 in 1962-63.

Consolidation
In 1964, the college's trustees agreed to a consolidation with Lawrence College in Appleton, Wisconsin. The  campus was sold to the University of Wisconsin–Milwaukee, and 49 female students and 21 faculty members transferred to Lawrence. Buildings and land from its former campus still form part of the present-day campus of the University of Wisconsin–Milwaukee. At Lawrence, some Milwaukee-Downer traditions have been adopted, such as the assignment of class colors.

Notable people
Elda Emma Anderson (1899-1961), professor of physics, health physics pioneer, isolated uranium-235 as part of Manhattan Project
Helen Daniels Bader (1927-1978), alumna, philanthropist and businesswoman. 
Ethelwynn Rice Beckwith (1879-1955), taught mathematics and astronomy at Milwaukee-Downer from 1925 to 1947
Emily Hale (1891-1969), speech and drama teacher long associated with T. S. Eliot
Mary Mortimer (1816–1877), British-born American educator
Ellen Torelle Nagler (1870–1965), American biologist, author, lecturer
Minerva Brace Norton (1837-1894), American educator and author
Emma May Alexander Reinertsen (1853–1920), writer, social reformer
Liz Richardson (1918–1945), Red Cross volunteer and clubmobiler in WW2
Margaret S. Rood (1908–1984), chair of occupational therapy program at the University of Southern California

References

Further reading
 Kieckhefer, Grace Norton. "Milwaukee-Downer College History, 1851-1951." Milwaukee-Downer College Bulletin, 33:2,1950.
 Stephens, Carolyn King. Downer Women, 1851-2001. Milwaukee: Sea King Publications, 2003.

External links 
The Milwaukee-Downer Woman

 
Educational institutions established in 1848
Educational institutions disestablished in 1964
Defunct private universities and colleges in Wisconsin
Lawrence University
Universities and colleges in Milwaukee
1848 establishments in Wisconsin
1964 disestablishments in Wisconsin